George William Frederick Osborne, 6th Duke of Leeds,  (21 July 1775 – 10 July 1838), styled Earl of Danby until 1789 and Marquess of Carmarthen from 1789 to 1799, was a British peer and politician. He served as Master of the Horse between 1827 and 1830. He also was Governor of Scilly.

Background
Leeds was born in London, the eldest son of Francis Osborne, 5th Duke of Leeds, and his first wife, Amelia, Baroness Darcy de Knayth, daughter of Robert Darcy, 4th Earl of Holderness. Francis Osborne, 1st Baron Godolphin, was his younger brother. His parents divorced in 1779. In January 1784, aged eight, he succeeded as 13th Baron Darcy de Knayth and 10th Baron Conyers on the early death of his mother. In 1799 he also succeeded his father in the dukedom of Leeds.

Political career
Leeds was appointed Lord Lieutenant of the North Riding of Yorkshire in 1802, a post he held until his death. In May 1827 he entered George Canning's government as Master of the Horse. He continued in this office under Lord Goderich between August 1827 and January 1828 and under the Duke of Wellington between January 1828 and November 1830. He was sworn of the Privy Council in 1827 and made a Knight of the Garter the same month.

Family

Leeds married Lady Charlotte Townshend, daughter of George Townshend, 1st Marquess Townshend, on 17 August 1797. They had three children:

Francis Godolphin Osborne, 7th Duke of Leeds (1798–1859)
Lady Charlotte Mary Anne Georgiana Osborne (c. 1806–1836), married Sackville Lane-Fox and had issue.
Lord Conyers George Thomas William Osborne (1812–1831), died young.

The Duke of Leeds died in London in July 1838, aged 62, and was buried in the Osborne family chapel at All Hallows Church, Harthill, South Yorkshire. He was succeeded in the dukedom by his eldest and only surviving son, Francis. The Duchess of Leeds died in July 1856, aged 80.

References

|-

1775 births
1838 deaths
Osborne, George
Knights of the Garter
Lord-Lieutenants of the North Riding of Yorkshire
George
106
Members of the Privy Council of the United Kingdom
Burials at Osborne family chapel, All Hallows' Church (Harthill)
Barons Darcy de Knayth
Barons Conyers
Governors of the Isles of Scilly